The 2019 Idol Star Championships Lunar New Year Special was held at Samsan World Gymnasium in Incheon was broadcast on MBC on February 5 and 6, 2019.

Cast

Presenters 
Jun Hyun-moo, Super Junior's Leeteuk and Twice's Sana.

Participants 
Full 2019 ISAC Lunar New Year's line-up

Results

Men 

 Athletics

 Archery

 Bowling

 Foot Volleyball

Women 

 Athletics

 Rhythmic Gymnastics

 Archery

 Bowling

Ratings

References

External Links

 2019 New year idol

MBC TV original programming
South Korean variety television shows
South Korean game shows
2019 in South Korean television
Idol Star Athletics Championships